Psiloderces is a genus of six eyed spiders in the family Psilodercidae, first described by Eugène Simon in 1892.

Species
 it contains thirty-eight species, found in Southeast Asia:
 Psiloderces albostictus Deeleman-Reinhold, 1995 — Thailand
 Psiloderces althepoides Deeleman-Reinhold, 1995 — Borneo
 Psiloderces bangkiraiensis Li & Chang, 2020 — Borneo
 Psiloderces bolang Li & Chang, 2020 — Sulawesi
 Psiloderces bontocensis Li & Chang, 2020 — Luzon
 Psiloderces cattienensis Li & Chang, 2020 — Vietnam
 Psiloderces coronatus Deeleman-Reinhold, 1995 — Java
 Psiloderces cuyapoensis Li & Chang, 2020 — Luzon
 Psiloderces dicellocerus Li, Li & Jäger, 2014 — Flores
 Psiloderces egeria Simon, 1892 — Philippines
 Psiloderces elasticus (Brignoli, 1975) — Sri Lanka
 Psiloderces enigmatus Deeleman-Reinhold, 1995 — Borneo
 Psiloderces fredstonei Deeleman-Reinhold, 1995 — Thailand
 Psiloderces gawanaensis Li & Chang, 2020 — Luzon
 Psiloderces grohotensis Li & Chang, 2020 — Borneo
 Psiloderces heise Li & Chang, 2020 — Luzon
 Psiloderces howarthi Deeleman-Reinhold, 1995 — Thailand
 Psiloderces incomptus Wang & Li, 2013 — China
 Psiloderces kalimantan Deeleman-Reinhold, 1995 — Borneo
 Psiloderces leclerci Deeleman-Reinhold, 1995 — Sulawesi
 Psiloderces leucopygius Deeleman-Reinhold, 1995 — Sumatra
 Psiloderces ligula Baert, 1988 — Sulawesi
 Psiloderces limosa Deeleman-Reinhold, 1995 — Sumatra
 Psiloderces longipalpis Baert, 1988 — Sulawesi
 Psiloderces malinoensis Li & Chang, 2020 — Sulawesi
 Psiloderces nasicornis Baert, 1988 — Sulawesi
 Psiloderces palopoensis Li & Chang, 2020 — Sulawesi
 Psiloderces penaeorum Deeleman-Reinhold, 1995 — Thailand
 Psiloderces penajamensis Li & Chang, 2020 — Borneo
 Psiloderces pingguo Li & Chang, 2020 — Vietnam
 Psiloderces pulcher Deeleman-Reinhold, 1995 — Borneo
 Psiloderces septentrionalis Deeleman-Reinhold, 1995 — Thailand
 Psiloderces suthepensis Deeleman-Reinhold, 1995 — Thailand
 Psiloderces tesselatus Deeleman-Reinhold, 1995 — Java
 Psiloderces torajanus Deeleman-Reinhold, 1995 — Sulawesi
 Psiloderces vallicola Deeleman-Reinhold, 1995 — Sumatra
 Psiloderces wangou Li & Chang, 2020 — Sulawesi
 Psiloderces xichang Li & Chang, 2020 — Luzon

References 

Psilodercidae
Araneomorphae genera
Spiders of Asia